Qixia is a landlocked county-level city of the Shandong Peninsula, and is under the administration of Yantai City, Shandong province.

It borders Penglai to the north, Fushan District to the northeast, Muping District to the east, Haiyang and Laiyang to the south, Zhaoyuan to the west, and Longkou to the northwest.

Administrative divisions
As 2012, this city is divided to 3 subdistricts and 12 towns.
Subdistricts
Cuizhan Subdistrict
Zhuangyuan Subdistrict
Songshan Subdistrict

Towns

Climate

References

External links 
 Official homepage

 
Cities in Shandong
County-level divisions of Shandong
Yantai